The women's 1500 metres at the 1978 European Athletics Championships was held in Prague, then Czechoslovakia, at Stadion Evžena Rošického on 1 and 3 September 1978.

Medalists

Results

Final
3 September

Heats
1 September

Heat 1

Heat 2

Participation
According to an unofficial count, 20 athletes from 14 countries participated in the event.

 (2)
 (1)
 (1)
 (1)
 (2)
 (1)
 (1)
 (1)
 (1)
 (2)
 (3)
 (1)
 (2)
 (1)

References

1500 metres
1500 metres at the European Athletics Championships
1978 in women's athletics